Jean Jolivet (9 January 1925 – 8 March 2018) was a French philosopher and medievalist.
He was an authority on Medieval philosophy and honorary director of studies at the École Pratique des Hautes Études in Paris. He was co-director of the publication series "Études de philosophie médiévale" (founded by Étienne Gilson) for the Vrin Library of philosophy. Jolivet has been an influential mentor for, and collaborator with, Constant Mews, particularly in relation to Peter Abelard.<ref>[https://books.google.com/books?id=8aGPhkxcqMMC&pg=PR9&lpg=PR9&dq=%22Jean+Jolivet%22+%22École+Pratique+des+Hautes+Études%22&source=bl&ots=FcFTSOs1EX&sig=T_kX2DzAULx18t1Y92O9tGHXdEw&hl=en&ei=BZIqTdS7AoGHnAen_6DuAQ&sa=X&oi=book_result&ct=result&resnum=9&ved=0CFYQ6AEwCA#v=onepage&q&f=false Constant J. Mews, The Lost Love Letters of Heloise and Abelard: Perceptions of Dialogue in Twelfth Century France" Pelgrave, New York, 2001, p. ix] (retrieved 10 January 2011]</ref>

In 1997, a book was published honoring his work, titled Langages et philosophie. Hommage à Jean Jolivet.  (Its English title is Languages and Philosophy: A Tribute to Jean Jolivet.) 

 Publications 
Amongst Jolivet's publications are:Perspectives médiévales et arabes, Vrin, 2006
 Le siècle de saint Bernard et Abélard, Fayard, 1982
 La Théologie et les arabes, Editions du Cerf, 2002
 La Théologie d'Abélard'', Editions du Cerf, 1997

Notes

1925 births
2018 deaths
People from Saint-Cloud
École Normale Supérieure alumni
Academic staff of the École pratique des hautes études
French historians of philosophy
20th-century French philosophers
French medievalists